The Fairy Jobmother is a reality documentary television series that follows Hayley Taylor as she assists job-challenged families to motivate them to get back on the payroll.

The program began with a 3 episode UK series on Channel 4 broadcast starting July 2010.

This was followed with an 8 episode US series on Lifetime, premiering on October 28, 2010.

A second UK series followed starting June 2011, this time with 4 episodes.

The US series was subsequently broadcast in the UK on Channel 4 as "Series 3".

Episodes

US Season (2010)

References

2010s American reality television series
2010 American television series debuts
2010 American television series endings
English-language television shows
Lifetime (TV network) original programming